The Nemzeti Bajnokság I/A (commonly abbreviated NB I/A) is the highest level league of club men's basketball in Hungary.

Format
The league comprises 14 teams. A NB I/A season is split into a league stage and a playoff/playout stage. At the end of the league stage (14 teams) the top 5 teams play another league stage, another 5 play with each other, and then the top 8 teams qualify for the playoff stage. The playoffs are played in "Best of five" format. The winning team of the final round are the champions of that season.

The two bottom teams play with each other in  "Best of three" format. The losing team gets relegated.

Current season

Teams of the 2022–23 season

Champions

Titles by club

Format
As we can see from the chart the number of teams in the Hungarian First Division changed a lot and continuously. The league started in 1933 with ten teams and with the formation of teams the league expanded continuously. Currently, there are 14 teams in the first division.

See also
Magyar Kupa (men's basketball)

References

External links
 Hungarian Basketball Association official website

  
Basketball leagues in Hungary
Basketball
Sports leagues established in 1933
1933 establishments in Hungary
Basketball leagues in Europe
Professional sports leagues in Hungary